Radzyń Chełmiński is a town in Grudziądz County, Kuyavian-Pomeranian Voivodeship, Poland, with 1,946 inhabitants (2004).

History
Radzyń is located within the historic Chełmno Land, which became part of the emerging Polish state in the 10th century. It was annexed by Prussia in the First Partition of Poland in 1772, and then restored to Poland after it regained independence following World War I in 1918.

During the German occupation of Poland (World War II), in autumn of 1939, the Germans carried out mass arrests of local Poles as part of the Intelligenzaktion. Arrested Poles were imprisoned in nearby Rywałd and then massacred in the forests of nearby Stara Ruda.

Points of interest
The town contains the ruins of Radzyń Chełmiński Castle, first built in 1234 by the Teutonic Knights.

Other Gothic sights include the parish church of St. Anne, which construction started about 1310 and finished about 1340, and the chapel of St. George. A memorial dedicated to local Poles-victims of World War II and Nazi Germany-is located at the market square.

Sports
The local football team is Radzynianka Radzyń Chełmiński. It competes in the lower leagues.

References

Cities and towns in Kuyavian-Pomeranian Voivodeship
Grudziądz County
Pomeranian Voivodeship (1919–1939)